The Florida Central and Western Railroad was a rail line built in the late 1800s that ran from Jacksonville west across North Central Florida and the part Florida Panhandle through Lake City and Tallahassee before coming to an end at Chattahoochee.  The line was later part of the Seaboard Air Line Railroad network from 1903 to 1967, and was primarily their Tallahassee Subdivision.  The full line is still in service today and is now part of the Florida Gulf and Atlantic Railroad.

History

Construction and early years

From Jacksonville west to Lake City, the Florida Central and Western Railroad was first built by the Florida, Atlantic and Gulf Central Railroad (not to be confused with the Florida Gulf and Atlantic Railroad, the current operator of the line).  The Florida, Atlantic and Gulf Central Railroad (FA&GC) was chartered on January 24, 1851 by Abel Seymour Baldwin (the namesake of Baldwin, Florida) and construction began at Lake City in 1857.  During the Civil War, the railroad figured in the Battle of Olustee when Union Brigadier General Truman Seymour led troops west toward Lake City along the line, destroying the junction at Baldwin, and then engaging Confederate troops near Olustee Station. The tracks and junction were rebuilt after the war, but the railroad defaulted on its payments to the Florida Internal Improvement Fund.

From Lake City to Tallahassee, the Florida Central and Western was built by the Pensacola and Georgia Railroad (P&G).  The Pensacola and Georgia Railroad was chartered in January 1853, and was to be built east from Pensacola, Florida, but instead started at Tallahassee and was built east. It reached Lake City, Florida in 1860 where it connected to the Florida, Atlantic and Gulf Central.   The P&G also built a short branch from Drifton north to Monticello.  In 1855, the P&G also took over the Tallahassee Railroad, which ran south from Tallahassee to the port at St. Marks, Florida on the Gulf of Mexico.  The P&G then built from Tallahassee west to four miles (6 km) short of Quincy, stopping in 1863 in the middle of the American Civil War.

George W. Swepson, a notorious scalawag, purchased both the P&G and the FA&GC in 1868.  After renaming the FA&GC the Florida Central Railroad, set his carpetbagger protégé, Milton S. Littlefield, a former Union general known as the "Prince of Carpetbaggers", loose in Tallahassee to buy, cheat, and otherwise defraud Florida legislators in order to obtain a new charter for a railroad that Littlefield promised would be extended west from Quincy to Pensacola.

Backed by $6 million in capitalization, the P&G was reorganized as the Jacksonville, Pensacola and Mobile Railroad in June 1869 with Littlefield as president.  The original charter did not consolidate the Florida Central Railroad into the JP&M; this did not occur until the Florida legislature amended the charter in 1870.  Littlefield and Swepson then launched a major swindle, personally enriching themselves from the sales of company bonds to unwitting investors. Due to the embezzling of such funds, the company was unable to extend the line to Pensacola, reaching only an additional 20 miles to Chattahoochee instead.  By 1879, the U.S. Supreme Court had a lien placed on the railroad's assets.

In 1882, the JP&M and the Florida Central were both acquired by Sir Edward Reed, and were renamed together as the Florida Central and Western Railroad. Two years later, Reed brought the Florida Central and Western and several other Florida railroads he had purchased under the umbrella of what was named the Florida Railway and Navigation Company, which was renamed the Florida Central and Peninsular Railroad (FC&P) in 1888. In 1900, a year after purchasing the majority of FC&P stock, the newly organized Seaboard Air Line Railway leased the FC&P and, in 1903, acquired it outright.

Seaboard Air Line ownership

The line would become an important route for the Seaboard Air Line.  The easternmost 17 miles of the line from Jacksonville to Baldwin became part if the Seaboard's main line.  The rest of the line from Baldwin to Chattahoochee was became the Seaboard's Tallahassee Subdivision.  The branch to Monticello became the Monticello Subdivision, while track from Tallahassee to St. Marks became the Wakulla Subdivision.

The Tallahassee Subdivision was notably used by the Seaboard Air Line for passenger service from Jacksonville to New Orleans, which was operated jointly with the Louisville and Nashville Railroad.  This daily passenger service was known as the New Orleans-Florida Express and the New Orleans-Florida Limited before being renamed the Gulf Wind in 1949.

In addition to passenger service, the line also carried two daily Red Ball freight trains and a local freight train six days a week round-trip from Baldwin to Tallahassee in the 1950s.  A through freight train also ran from Tallahassee to Chattahoochee daily at the time.  The line was busy enough in the 1950s to warrant the installation of Centralized traffic control along the Tallahassee Subdivision from Baldwin to a point just west of Tallahassee.

Later years
In 1967, the Seaboard Air Line merged with their long-time rival, the Atlantic Coast Line Railroad (ACL). The Tallahassee Subdivision crossed or connected with ACL branch lines in Jacksonville, Mattox, Live Oak, Drifton, and Chattahoochee. After the merger was complete, the company was named the Seaboard Coast Line Railroad (SCL).  In 1980, the Seaboard Coast Line's parent company merged with the Chessie System, creating the CSX Corporation.  The CSX Corporation initially operated the Chessie and Seaboard Systems separately until 1986, when they were merged into CSX Transportation.

The Gulf Wind continued to operate on the Tallahassee Subdivision under the Seaboard Coast Line until 1971, when passenger service was taken over by Amtrak.  This left the line without passenger service until 1993, when the Amtrak extended the Sunset Limited to Miami via Jacksonville.  The Sunset Limited ran the line until late 2005 due to damage as a result of Hurricane Katrina further west.  The Sunset Limited has terminated in New Orleans ever since.

Current operations
The Florida Gulf and Atlantic Railroad took over operation of the former Florida Central and Western Railroad on June 1, 2019, after its parent company, RailUSA, acquired the line from CSX Transportation. As part of the deal, the Florida Gulf and Atlantic also took over the former Pensacola and Atlantic Railroad west to Pensacola, and track from Tallahassee north to Attapulgus, Georgia.

Historic stations

References

Defunct Florida railroads
Predecessors of the Seaboard Air Line Railroad
Railway companies established in 1882
Railway companies disestablished in 1884
5 ft gauge railways in the United States
1882 establishments in Florida